Filip Vaško (born 11 August 1999) is a Slovak professional footballer who currently plays for Fortuna Liga club Zemplín Michalovce as a defender.

Club career

MFK Zemplín Michalovce
Vaško made his Fortuna Liga debut for Zemplín Michalovce against AS Trenčín on 12 September 2020.

References

External links
 MFK Zemplín Michalovce official club profile 
 
 
 Futbalnet profile 

1999 births
Living people
People from Rožňava
Slovak footballers
Slovak expatriate footballers
Slovakia youth international footballers
Association football defenders
Udinese Calcio players
MFK Zemplín Michalovce players
Slovak Super Liga players
Expatriate footballers in Italy
Slovak expatriate sportspeople in Italy